Ike Reighley House is a historic home located at Newberry, Newberry County, South Carolina, USA. It was built about 1885, and is a two-story, asymmetrical weatherboarded Victorian style dwelling. It features stick style decorative details on the wraparound porch.

It was listed on the National Register of Historic Places in 1980.

References

Houses on the National Register of Historic Places in South Carolina
Victorian architecture in South Carolina
Houses completed in 1885
Houses in Newberry County, South Carolina
National Register of Historic Places in Newberry County, South Carolina
Newberry, South Carolina